Suspiros Bay is a small bay indenting the west end of Joinville Island just south of Madder Cliffs. The name was proposed by Captain Emilio L. Diaz, commander of the Argentine Antarctic task force (1951–52). The toponym alludes to the difficulties encountered in surrounding the bay.

See also
Balaena Valley

Bays of Graham Land
Landforms of the Joinville Island group